The Haval H2s is a subcompact CUV produced by the Haval sub-brand of Chinese manufacturer Great Wall.

Overview
The Haval H2s is positioned slightly above the subcompact Haval H2 with a more modern design similar to the second generation Haval H6. Just like the other crossover products of Haval at the time, the model is available in two variations called the Red Label and Blue Label models. The variations features different styling in the front and rear end of the vehicle to target different target consumer groups.

The Haval H2s is powered by the same 1.5-litre turbocharged four-cylinder petrol engine as the H2, and produces 110 kW of power and 210Nm of torque. Gearbox is a seven-speed dual-clutch transmission supplied by Getrag.

2018 facelift
The Haval H2s was facelifted in 2018 and the two variant policy was dropped with only the previous Red Label model was facelifted with the updated Black Label Haval logo. The post-facelift model sports a new grill, and was discontinued as of 2020.

References 

Compact sport utility vehicles
Cars of China
H2s
2010s cars